Owston Woods is a  biological Site of Special Scientific Interest south of Owston in Leicestershire.

The dominant trees in these woods on Jurassic and glacial clay are ash and hazel. There are diverse moths, beetles and other insects, including some rare species, and there is also a variety of birds and small mammals.

A public footpath goes through the woods.

References

Sites of Special Scientific Interest in Leicestershire